Mark Nichols is a former American football wide receiver in the National Football League. Nichols was selected in the first round by the Detroit Lions out of San Jose State University in the 1981 NFL Draft.

External links
NFL.com player page

1959 births
Living people
Players of American football from Bakersfield, California
American football wide receivers
San Jose State Spartans football players
Detroit Lions players